Atrangii was an Indian Hindi-language general entertainment channel launched on DD free dish, owned by Vibhu Agarwal. after five month it's launched, Now it has been closed down from the DD free dish since 20th November 2022.

Shows 
Parshuram 2.0 
Ishq Hai
Atrangii Shorts
Jaghanya
Bestsellers

Former Shows
Hara Sindoor

Dramas
Nishabd
Hara Sindoor
Bheja Fry

History
It was airing several local television shows as well as few acquired shows from Pakistani television networks. Before closed down, It had aired on TV as well as mobile application and website is also there.
<ref><

References

External links 
 Official facebook page of Atrangii

Hindi-language television channels in India
Television channels and stations established in 2022
Hindi-language television stations
Television stations in Mumbai